Shinepukur Ceramics is a ceramic manufacturing company based in Dhaka, Bangladesh.

Incorporated in 1997, Shinepukur Ceramics went into commercial production at the end of 1999. In 2005, it became a subsidiary of Beximco group when the latter acquired the 100% share of the company.

In 2011, Shinepukur Ceramics were awarded the national export trophy by the Export Promotion Bureau for their export performances during 2009-2010. They also won the "Dun and Bradstreet Corporate Award 2010" in the ceramic category from Dun & Bradstreet Rating Agency Bangladesh Limited.

References 

BEXIMCO group
Ceramics manufacturers of Bangladesh
Companies established in 1997
Bangladeshi brands
Manufacturing companies based in Dhaka